Sayeed Tahir Shah (born 5 February 1980) is an Afghan football player who plays for Maiwand Kabul FC.

Club career

International career
He made his debut for Afghanistan national football team on 15 February 2002 in a friendly match at Kabul against a selection of ISAF where he scored Afghanistan's goal. He had been a member of a squad for 2004 AFC Asian Cup qualification where he scored a goal against
Kyrgyzstan.

National team statistics

International Goals

External links
 
 
 fifa.com
 nepalnews.com.np
 the-afc.com

Afghan footballers
1980 births
Living people
Footballers at the 2002 Asian Games
Association football forwards
Asian Games competitors for Afghanistan
Afghanistan international footballers